Raúl López (born April 15, 1929) is a Cuban former Negro league pitcher who played in the 1940s.

A native of Caimito del Guayabal, Cuba, López played for the New York Cubans in 1948. In his 13 recorded appearances, he posted a 4.30 ERA over 58.2 innings.

References

External links
 and Seamheads

1929 births
Possibly living people
New York Cubans players
Cuban baseball players
Baseball pitchers
People from Artemisa Province